The Local Government (Miscellaneous Provisions) Act 1982 is an Act of the Parliament of the United Kingdom that grants a variety of powers to local authorities in England and Wales, including the power to regulate public entertainment, sex establishments, street trading, and take-away food shops.

See also 
 Street trading licence
 Sex establishment licence
Licensing Act 2003

References 

United Kingdom Acts of Parliament 1982
Local government legislation in the United Kingdom